Campos del Malecón, also known as simply El Malecón or Estadio El Malecón, is a stadium in Torrelavega, Spain.  It is currently used for football matches and is the home stadium of Gimnástica de Torrelavega.  The stadium holds 6,007 spectators and was extensively refurbished in 2011. The ground reopened on 22 January 2012 when Gimnástica played CD Guijuelo. It also hosted the rugby union test match between Spain and Chile on 21 November 2015.

References

External links
Stadium information
Estadios de España 

Football venues in Cantabria
Gimnástica de Torrelavega
Sports venues completed in 1922
Torrelavega
Rugby union stadiums in Spain